The name Moriarty is an Anglicized version of the Irish name Ó Muircheartaigh  which originated in County Kerry in Ireland. Ó Muircheartaigh can be translated to mean 'navigator' or 'sea worthy', as the Irish word muir means sea (cognate to the Latin word mare for 'sea') and ceardach means skilled. Several prominent people have the Irish name Moriarty, mostly as a surname.

Using documentary evidence, flavoured by legend, researchers have isolated historical data using books by O'Hart, McLysaght and O'Brien, the Four Masters, baptismals, parish records, and ancient land grants. Despite the loss of records caused by the fire in the Dublin Records Office in 1922 which was an irreparable disaster to Irish historians, sufficient evidence is still available to produce a thumbnail sketch of the Moriarty history.

Conclusions by these researchers show that the family name Moriarty was first found in county Kerry.

Spelling variations of the names were found in the archives researched, particularly when families attempted to translate the name from the Gaelic to the English. Although the name Moriarty occurred in many references, from time to time the surname was also officially recorded as Moriarty, O'Moriarty, Murtagh, Murtag, Murtaugh, McMoriarty, O'Murtagh, and these changes in spelling frequently occurred, even between father and son. Preferences for different spelling variations usually arose from a division of the family, or for religious reasons, or sometimes patriotic reasons. Church officials and scribes spelt the name as it sounded, sometimes several different ways in the lifetime of the same person. The abbreviations of Mc in front of a name, meaning 'son of' is popular in Irish names, although this is no guarantee that the name is Irish. Many Scottish names also prefer Mc instead of Mac. Officially in both countries, the abbreviation is Mac. In Ireland, frequently O' is also used before a name meaning the 'grandson of'.

Migrants
In North America, some of the first migrants which could be considered kinsmen of the sept Moriarty of that same family were Daniel, Ellen, Eugene, Margaret, Michael, Thomas Moriarty all settled in Boston in 1849; James, John, Martin, Maurice, and Michael Moriarty all arrived in Philadelphia between 1840 and 1860.

One Edward Moriarte (c 1644, Kerry, Lower Ormund, County Tipperary, Ireland) died in Anne Arundel Co, Maryland c 1688.

While a direct connection to Edward has not been made (and therefore the immigrant ancestor is not known), a family with surnames Meratta, Muratta, Marattay, Maratty, and so forth migrated from Maryland to Pennsylvania before 1790, and members migrated to the Nelson Co / Spencer Co region of Kentucky (outside Louisville) about 1805.

People with the surname
 Abram Moriarty (1830–1918), Irish-born Australian politician
 Ambrose Moriarty (1870–1949), English prelate of the Roman Catholic Church, former Bishop of Shrewsbury
 Bill Moriarty (baseball) (1883–1916), American baseball player briefly active in 1909
 Brendan Moriarty, ophthalmic surgeon mostly known for introducing intraocular telescope surgery for macular degeneration
 Brendan Moriarty, American film director and Media owner of The Cambodian Journal. He is the grandson to Joseph B Moriarty, New Hampshire Labor Union Leader from 1936 to 1985.
 Brian Moriarty (born 1956), computer game author mostly known for Trinity and Loom
 Cathy Moriarty (born 1960), American actress nominated for a Best Supporting Actress Academy Award for her role in Raging Bull
 Cecil Moriarty (1877–1958), Irish-born Chief Constable of Birmingham and rugby international
 Clare Moriarty, British civil servant
 Colm Moriarty (born 1979), Irish professional golfer
 Dan Moriarty (footballer, born 1875) (1875–1903), Australian rules footballer
 Dan Moriarty (footballer, born 1895) (1895–1982), Australian rules footballer
 David Moriarty (1814–1877), Irish Roman Catholic bishop and pulpit orator
 David H. Moriarty (1911–1989), American sound engineer
 Ed Moriarty (1912–1991), American Major League Baseball player
 Edward Orpen Moriarty (1824–1896), Australian civil engineer
 Erin Moriarty (journalist) (born 1952), American television news reporter
 Erin Moriarty (actress) (born 1994), American actress
 Fiach Moriarty, Irish singer-songwriter
 Gene Moriarty (1863–1904), American Major League Baseball outfielder
 Geoff Moriarty (1871–1948), Australian rules footballer
 George Moriarty (1884–1964), American Major League Baseball player, manager and umpire
 George Andrews Moriarty, Jr (1883–1968), American genealogist
 Greg Moriarty (born 1964), Australian public servant and diplomat
 Hardesty Gilmore Maratta (1864-1924), American artist, paint manufacturer, and color theorist
 Jack Moriarty (1901–1980), Australian rules footballer
 Jim Moriarty (born 1953), New Zealand actor and theatre director
 James Moriarty (disambiguation), several people
 Jeremiah J. Moriarty (1914–1995), New York politician and judge
 Jerry Moriarty (born 1938), American artist
 Joan Moriarty (1923–2020), nursing sister, Matron-in-Chief/Director of the Queen Alexandra's Royal Army Nursing Corps from 1977 to 1981
 Joan Denise Moriarty (early 1910s?–1992), Irish dancer, teacher and choreographer, founder of professional ballet in Ireland
 John Moriarty (disambiguation), several people
 Joseph Vincent Moriarty (1910–1979), Irish-American mobster
 Judith Moriarty (born 1942), American politician
 Kieran Moriarty, British physician
 Larry Moriarty (born 1958), American former National Football League player
 Laura Moriarty (novelist) (born 1970), American author from Hawaii
 Laura Moriarty (poet and novelist) (born 1952), American poet and novelist from Minnesota
 Liane Moriarty (born 1966), Australian author 
 Michael Moriarty (disambiguation), several people
 Merion Moriarty (1794–1864), Irish-born Australian politician
 Paddy Moriarty, Gaelic footballer from Northern Ireland in the 1970s
 Pat Moriarty (American football) (born 1955), football executive for the National Football League's Baltimore Ravens
 Patrick Moriarty (disambiguation), several people
 Paul Moriarty (disambiguation), several people
 Philip Moriarty (born 1968), Irish physicist and professor of physics at the University of Nottingham
 P. H. Moriarty (born 1939), British actor
 Richard Moriarty (born 1957), Welsh former international rugby union captain
 Robert J. Moriarty (born 1946), American Marine fighter pilot
 Ross Moriarty (born 1994), Welsh international rugby union player
 Stephen Moriarty (born 1949), American politician
 Teague Moriarty (born 1983), American chef
 Terry Moriarty (1925–2011), Australian rules footballer
 Thomas Moriarty (1812–1894), Church of Ireland clergyman
 Tom Moriarty (born 1953), American former National Football League player
 William Moriarty (1890–1936), a leader of the Communist Party of Canada who sided with the Right Opposition

See also
 Moriarty (disambiguation)
 Jay Moriarity, American surfer
 Mícheál Ó Muircheartaigh, Irish Gaelic Games commentator

References

External links
Moriarty family pedigree at Library Ireland

Surnames of Irish origin
Irish families
Anglicised Irish-language surnames